Fyodor Nikolayevich Chalov (born 10 April 1998) is a Russian professional footballer who plays as a striker for CSKA Moscow and the Russia national team.

Club career

CSKA Moscow
Chalov made his debut for the main squad of PFC CSKA Moscow in the Russian Cup game against Yenisey Krasnoyarsk on 21 September 2016.

On 2 November 2016, he scored four goals for CSKA's Under-19 team in a UEFA Youth League 5–0 victory against Monaco.

Following that game, he was called up to the main squad (with the first-choice forward Lacina Traoré struggling with only 4 goals in the first 15 season games) and made his Russian Premier League debut on 6 November 2016 as a late substitute in a game against Amkar Perm. On the next matchday on 18 November 2016, he made his first starting-lineup appearance for CSKA against Arsenal Tula, and on 22 November he started their next Champions League game against Bayer Leverkusen. He scored his first goal for CSKA on 3 December 2016 in a game against Ural Yekaterinburg.

On 27 February 2017, Chalov signed a new contract with CSKA, keeping him at the club until 2020. On 12 December 2018, he scored a goal in a 3–0 win over Real Madrid in the Santiago Bernabéu Stadium. He later signed a new contract until the summer of 2022 on 22 January 2019.

After only scoring twice in his first 21 appearances of the 2020–21 season in the Russian Premier League and UEFA Europa League, he scored a hat-trick on 17 December 2020 in a 3–1 away victory over FC Rostov.

Loan to Basel
On 1 February 2022, Chalov joined Swiss club Basel on a six month loan until the end of their 2021–22 FC Basel season under head coach Patrick Rahmen. Chalov played his domestic league debut for his new club in the home game in the St. Jakob Stadium on 6 February as Basel played a 3–3 draw against Sion. He scored his first goal for the club on 19 February in the home game in the St. Jakob Stadium against Lausanne-Sport as Basel won 3–0. His last game with Basel was on 22 May as Basel won 2–1 against Lugano. Chalov gave the assist to Darian Males' goal in the sixth minute. During his time with Basel, Chalov played a total of 19 games for Basel scoring a total of 5 goals. 14 of these games were in the Swiss Super League, two in the 2021–22 UEFA Europa Conference League and three were friendly games. He scored four goals in the domestic league, the other was scored during the test games.

International career
Chalov scored three goals for the Russia U17 national team at the 2015 FIFA U-17 World Cup.

On 11 May 2018, he was included in the senior national team's extended 2018 FIFA World Cup squad, which was the first time he was called up to the senior national team. He was not included in the finalized World Cup squad.

He made his debut for the team on 21 March 2019 in a UEFA Euro 2020 qualifier against Belgium.

Personal life
His father is a research chemist, while his older brother Daniil Chalov is also a professional footballer. In his youth he excelled at piano and flute as well as football.

Career statistics

Club

International

Honours
CSKA Moscow
Russian Super Cup: 2018

Individual
Russian Premier League top goalscorer: 2018–19
Best young soccer player of Russia: 2017

References

External links
 
 

Living people
1998 births
Footballers from Moscow
Russian footballers
Association football forwards
Russia international footballers
Russia under-21 international footballers
Russia youth international footballers
PFC CSKA Moscow players
FC Basel players
Russian Premier League players
Russian expatriate footballers
Russian expatriate sportspeople in Switzerland
Expatriate footballers in Switzerland